Geoxus is a genus of South American rodents in the tribe Abrotrichini of family Cricetidae. Two species—Geoxus valdivianus and Geoxus annectens are known.

References 

 Musser, G.G. and Carleton, M.D. 2005. Superfamily Muroidea. Pp. 894–1531 in Wilson, D.E. and Reeder, D.M. (eds.). Mammal Species of the World: a taxonomic and geographic reference. 3rd ed. Baltimore: The Johns Hopkins University Press, 2 vols., 2142 pp. 

 
Rodent genera
Taxa named by Oldfield Thomas
Taxonomy articles created by Polbot